Karl Wilhelm Konrad Arwe (28 January 1898 – 8 April 1980) was a Swedish ice hockey player, bandy player, and footballer who competed in the 1920 Summer Olympics and in the 1924 Winter Olympics. He was born in Ölserud, Sweden, but grew up in Stockholm, Sweden.

In 1920 he was a member of the Swedish ice hockey team which finished fourth in the Summer Olympics tournament. He played three matches and scored two goals.

Four years later he finished again fourth with the Swedish team in the first Winter Olympics ice hockey tournament.

He played 16 times for Sweden between 1920 and 1924 and scored 5 goals. He represented for IK Göta and Djurgårdens IF. In 1921 he won the European championship. In 1926 he became Swedish champion with Djurgården.

References

External links
profile

1898 births
1980 deaths
Association footballers not categorized by position
Djurgårdens IF Fotboll players
Djurgårdens IF Hockey players
Ice hockey players at the 1920 Summer Olympics
Ice hockey players at the 1924 Winter Olympics
IK Göta Bandy players
IK Göta Ishockey players
Olympic ice hockey players of Sweden
Sportspeople from Stockholm
Swedish bandy players
Swedish footballers